The Battle of Frenchman's Butte, fought on May 28, 1885, occurred when a force of Cree, dug in on a hillside near Frenchman's Butte, was unsuccessfully attacked by the Alberta Field Force. It was fought in what was then the District of Saskatchewan of the North-West Territories.

Background
Members of a band of Cree led by war chief Wandering Spirit, living in what is now central Alberta and Saskatchewan joined the North-West Rebellion of 1885 after the government forces' defeat at the Battle of Duck Lake. The starving fighters seized food and supplies from several white settlements and captured Fort Pitt, taking prisoners. Major-General Thomas Bland Strange, a retired British officer living near Calgary, raised a force of cowboys and other white settlers, added to them two units of North-West Mounted Police (NWMP), and headed north. He was reinforced by three infantry units from the east, bringing his forces to some 1,000 men. While he left some of his force to provide protection for the isolated white settlements along the way, he led several hundred troops east to Fort Pitt. The Cree burnt the fort ahead of him and retreated to the nearby hills. Over the next few days, Strange's scouts fought skirmishes with small groups of Cree and marched over Frenchman's Butte. On the night of May 27, the Cree dug in at the top of a hill east of the butte and waited.

The battle
Early on the morning of May 28, the Cree warriors divided into two groups. General Strange arrived opposite the Cree position at six in the morning and opened fire with a piece of artillery. The Cree responded, opening fire on Strange's units. Some Canadian troops tried to cross the valley, but they found the bottom covered in muskeg. On top of this, there was a steep, open hillside in front of the Cree, making any frontal assault suicidal. Strange pulled his forces back and deployed them along the bottom of the valley. The two units of NWMP formed the left flank. To their right was the 65th Battalion, Mount Royal Rifles, with the Winnipeg Light Infantry Battalion in the centre, while the right flank was formed by the Alberta Mounted Rifles.

The two sides exchanged fire for three hours. Cree rifle fire wounded some of the Canadian troops in the valley, while the Canadian artillery put holes in the hillside, damaging the trenches. Eventually, General Strange ordered Major Sam Steele to lead the NWMP north and outflank the Cree. The Cree saw this, and Wandering Spirit led a group of warriors along the tops of the hills, parallel to Steele, and occasionally opened fire. This caused the NWMP to believe that the Cree's lines were much longer than they actually were, so Steele turned back. Around the same time, some Cree warriors managed to outflank the Alberta Mounted Rifles and almost captured the supply train. Afraid of being attacked from behind, General Strange ordered his force to retreat. The Canadians withdrew to Fort Pitt after three hours of fighting. The Cree slipped away later that day, initiating the final stage of the rebellion, as more than 1,000 men searched the woods for Big Bear's band.

"On May 29, near Frenchman's Butte Inspector S.B. Steele made contact with an Indian scouting party. Steele's scouts called out to the party and were fired upon. Steele's troops returned fire and killed the first Indian casualty of the war.  They rode down with a friend to view the remains and found his body on top the hill where he evidently had been dragged by the scout. His body was stripped of all clothing with the rope (cut short to about one yard in length) still around his neck, which had cut into his jaw. He was a huge fine-looking Indian, 'Ma-me-book' by name. The scout who had captured his mount (a swift-footed black stallion belonging to the HBCo) had galloped around the prairie with the rope attached to his saddle pommel, trailing the body in the grass in circles, the trails of which were still visible. He had thus been left exposed for days before being buried; and his body from the intense heat, was huge in size when I saw him. I requested to have him buried." H.A. MacKay, memories, HBCo archives and Glenbow Archives.

Conclusion

The battle was a victory for the Cree, albeit a hollow one. It bought them time to escape from Strange, but the rebellion was hopeless. The Métis had been defeated at the Battle of Batoche three weeks earlier, and Poundmaker's joint Cree-Assiniboine force had been forced to surrender. The Big Bear band fell apart during the retreat to the north. The Battle of Loon Lake on June 3 demoralized them further, and by early July the rebellion was over. Big Bear was captured and imprisoned. Wandering Spirit was executed along with seven others. General Strange retired back to his ranch and the Alberta Field Force disbanded.

Legacy
In the spring of 2008, Tourism, Parks, Culture and Sport Minister Christine Tell proclaimed in Duck Lake, that "the 125th commemoration, in 2010, of the 1885 Northwest Resistance is an excellent opportunity to tell the story of the prairie Métis and First Nations peoples' struggle with Government forces and how it has shaped Canada today".

Frenchman Butte is a national historic site of Canada, which locates the theatre of the 1885 battle staged between Cree and Canadian troops.

See also
 List of battles won by Indigenous peoples of the Americas

References

Frenchman's Butte
Frenchman Butte No. 501, Saskatchewan
Frenchman's Butte
Frenchman's Butte
Frenchman's Butte
1885 in Canada
May 1885 events
1885 in Saskatchewan